Davidov is a village and municipality in the Vranov nad Topľou District in the Prešov Region of Slovakia.

Population
According to the 2011 census, the municipality had 794 inhabitants. 784 of inhabitants were Slovaks and 10 others and unspecified.

See also
 List of municipalities and towns in Slovakia

References

Genealogical resources
The records for genealogical research are available at the state archive "Statny Archiv in Presov, Slovakia"
 Roman Catholic church records (births/marriages/deaths): 1770-1895 (parish B)
 Greek Catholic church records (births/marriages/deaths): 1780-1933 (parish A)

External links
 
 
https://web.archive.org/web/20070427022352/http://www.statistics.sk/mosmis/eng/run.html
Surnames of living people in Davidov

Villages and municipalities in Vranov nad Topľou District